Valentyn Viktorovych Horokh (born 14 February 2001) is a Ukrainian professional football goalkeeper who plays for Oleksandriya in the Ukrainian Premier League.

Career
Born in Slavuta, Khmelnytskyi Oblast, Horokh began his training career in the neighbouring Shturm academy from Kostopil, and after continued in the Karpaty academy.

He played in the Ukrainian Second League for Karpaty Lviv and in July 2021 Horokh signed contract with the Ukrainian Premier League side Oleksandriya.

References

External links
 
 

2001 births
Living people
People from Slavuta
Ukrainian footballers
Ukraine youth international footballers
Association football goalkeepers
FC Karpaty Lviv players
FC Oleksandriya players
Ukrainian Premier League players
Ukrainian Second League players
Sportspeople from Khmelnytskyi Oblast